Petachiah of Regensburg, also known as Petachiah ben Yakov, Moses Petachiah, and Petachiah of Ratisbon, was a German rabbi of the twelfth and early thirteenth centuries CE. At some point he left his place of birth, Regensburg in Bavaria, and settled in Prague. He is best known for the description he wrote to document his extensive travels during the late twelfth century throughout Eastern Europe, the Caucasus, and the Middle East. He visited places such as Poland, Russia, Syria, Armenia, and Greece. His work was later published, apparently in an abridged form, in a travelogue that eventually became known under the title Travels of Rabbi Petachia of Ratisbon.

Petachiah was born in Regensburg, a city whose Jewish community was so renowned for its piety and learning that it was sometimes called the "Jewish Athens". He was the brother of Rabbi Yitzhak ha-Lavan ("the White") ben Yaakov, a renowned Jewish jurist. During his childhood Petachia was probably tutored by such scholars as Judah the Pious, aka Yehuda ben Shmuel, who is also thought to have travelled with him for a time, and who is credited with compiling a report of Petachiah's journey. Petachiah entrusted Judah the Pious with his travel notes which were then turned into the aforementioned travelogue.

Rabbi Petachiah also authored several glosses on the Talmud.

The dates of the travels described in his travelogue are uncertain, but are placed roughly between the years 1170 and 1187. He probably set out from Prague sometime between 1170 and 1180, and was certainly in Jerusalem prior to 1187, since he describes it as being under the control of the Latin Kingdom of Jerusalem. As Judah the Pious is supposed to have made the surviving manuscript copy of Petachiah's travelogue, the latter must have returned to Regensburg prior to that sage's death in 1217. Petachiah was recognised by sources as a merchant and it is thought that he, along with the other Jewish merchants of Regensburg, played a part in the development of a trade route that extended from Mainz to Kiev. Some of Petachiah's travelogue is devoted to discussing the oppression of Jews and the struggles they often faced in Greece and other neighboring lands.

Petachiah travelled east from Bohemia through Poland, Ruthenia, southern Ukraine (which he called Kedar), and the Crimean Gazaria (Genoese colonies). He describes the remnants of the Khazars and the early Crimean Karaite community. He then went south through the Kipchak khanates and the Caucasus into Armenia, sojourning for a while in Nisibis. From there he travelled to Mesopotamia, visiting Nineveh, Sura, Pumbedita, and Baghdad before moving on to Persia. Turning westward, he journeyed up the Euphrates and into Syria, visiting Aleppo and Damascus. He travelled onward to the Kingdom of Jerusalem, visiting holy sites in the Galilee and Judea, whence he may have taken to the sea. The next place he describes is Greece. From there, presumably, he returned home via the Balkans.

The date of Petachiah's death is unknown, but could be around 1225.

See also
 Chronology of European exploration of Asia
 Radhanites - medieval merchants, some of them Jewish
 Travelogues of Palestine
 Benjamin of Tudela

Sources

 New facsimile reprint of 1856 Benisch edition:

External links
Travels of Rabbi Petachia of Ratisbon, online version of the 1856 bilingual Benisch edition (PDF).

12th-century German rabbis
12th-century writers
Medieval Jewish travel writers
Explorers of Asia
Jewish explorers
12th-century births
13th-century deaths
Holy Land travellers
Clergy from Regensburg
Pilgrimage accounts
12th-century explorers

Year of birth unknown
Year of death unknown
13th-century Bohemian rabbis
12th-century Bohemian rabbis